The Ukrainian Institute of Modern Art (UIMA) is a modern art museum serving the Chicago area with an ongoing program of cultural exhibitions, literary events, film screenings, and music recitals. UIMA was founded in 1971 by Dr. Achilles Chreptowsky, Konstantin Milonadis and Mychajlo Urban in the heart of Chicago's Ukrainian Village, Chicago. Its Core Member of the Chicago Cultural Alliance, a consortium of 25 ethnic museums and cultural centres in Chicago.

Six to seven major exhibits are held in the main gallery which occupies . Two side galleries house the permanent collection which includes the work of Chicago artists as well as that of sculptors and painters of Ukrainian descent.

UIMA is committed to a program of exhibitions, concerts, lectures, and multidisciplinary events relevant and challenging to all members of the community. The immediate neighborhood is home to an ethnically diverse population and offers a wide variety of cultural events. UIMA is a not-for-profit organization.

In 2011, the Institute celebrated its 40th anniversary.

In 2010 the museum hosted a career retrospective of the art of Gladys Nilsson, noted member of the "Hairy Who" art group.

References

External links
 

Art museums and galleries in Chicago
Ukrainian-American culture in Chicago
Arts organizations of the Ukrainian diaspora
Art museums and galleries in Illinois
Ethnic museums in Illinois
Modern art museums in the United States
Ukrainian museums in the United States
Art museums established in 1971
1971 establishments in Illinois
Cultural centers in Chicago